The Capparaceae (or Capparidaceae), commonly known as the caper family, are a family of plants in the order Brassicales. As currently circumscribed, the family contains 33 genera and about 700 species. The largest genera are Capparis (about 150 species), Maerua (about 100 species), Boscia (37 species) and Cadaba (30 species).

Taxonomy 
The Capparaceae have long been considered closely related to and have often been included in the Brassicaceae, the mustard family (APG, 1998), in part because both groups produce glucosinolate (mustard oil) compounds. Subsequent molecular studies support Capparaceae sensu stricto as paraphyletic with respect to the Brassicaceae. However Cleome and several related genera are more closely related to members of the Brassicaceae than to the other Capparaceae. These genera are now either placed in the Brassicaceae (as subfamily Clemoideae) or segregated into the Cleomaceae. Several more genera of the traditional Capparaceae are more closely related to other members of the Brassicales, and the relationships of several more remain unresolved. Based on morphological grounds and supported by molecular studies, the American species traditionally identified as Capparis have been transferred to resurrected generic names. Several new genera have also been recently described.

Based on recent DNA-analysis, the Capparaceae are part of the core Brassicales, and based on limited testing, the following tree represent current insights in its relationship.

Genera

Excluded genera 
Borthwickia W.W.Sm. → Resedaceae
Cleome L. → Cleomaceae
Cleomella DC. → Cleomaceae
Dactylaena Schrad. ex Schult.f. → Cleomaceae
Forchhammeria Liebm. → Stixaceae
Haptocarpum Ule → Cleomaceae
Koeberlinia Zucc. → Koeberliniaceae
Oxystylis Torr. & Frem. → Cleomaceae
Pentadiplandra Baill. → Pentadiplandraceae
Podandrogyne Ducke → Cleomaceae
Polanisia Raf. → Cleomaceae
Setchellanthus Brandegee → Setchellanthaceae
Stixis Lour. → Stixaceae
Tirania Pierre → Stixaceae
Wislizenia Engelm. → Cleomaceae

Additional genera to be excluded from the Capparaceae, according to Kers in Kubitzki
1. Genera that may be capparalean but do not fit within the Capparaceae
Neothorelia Gagnep.

2. Genera insufficiently known, but whose descriptions indicate they cannot belong to the Capparaceae
Borthwickia W.W.Sm. → Borthwickiaceae  
Keithia Spreng.
Poilanedora Gagnep.
3. Genera not treated in Kubitzki, but usually regarded as Capparaceae 
Buhsia Bunge
Niebuhria DC.

References

Further reading
Cornejo, X. & H. H. Iltis. 2006. New combinations in Capparaceae sensu stricto for Flora of Ecuador. Harvard Pap. Bot. 11(1): 17–18.
Cornejo, X. & H. H. Iltis. 2008a. Two new genera of Capparaceae: Sarcotoxicum and Mesocapparis stat. nov., and the reinstatement of Neocalyptrocalyx. Harvard Pap. Bot. 13(1): 103-116.
Cornejo, X. & H. H. Iltis. 2008b. New combinations in South American Capparaceae. Harvard Pap. Bot. 13(1): 117-120.
Cornejo, X. & H. H. Iltis. 2008c. Anisocapparis y Monilicarpa: dos nuevos géneros de Capparaceae de América del Sur. J. Bot. Res. Inst. Texas 2(1): 61-74.
Cornejo, X. & H. H. Iltis. 2008d. The reinstatement of Capparidastrum. Harvard Pap. Bot. 13(2): 229-236.
Cornejo, X. & H. H. Iltis. 2008e. A revision of Colicodendron Mart. (Capparaceae s.s.). J. Bot. Res. Inst. Texas, 2(1): 75-93.
  
Hall, J. C., K. J. Sytsma and H. H. Iltis. 2002. Phylogeny of Capparaceae and Brassicaceae based on chloroplast sequence data. American Journal of Botany 89: 1826-1842 (abstract here).
Hall, J. C., H. H. Iltis and K. J. Sytsma. 2004. Molecular phylogenetics of core Brassicales, placement of orphan genera Emblingia, Forchhammeria, Tirania, and character evolution. Systematic Botany 29: 654-669 (abstract here).
Hall, J. C. 2008. Systematics of Capparaceae and Cleomaceae: an evaluation of the generic delimitations of Capparis and Cleome using plastid DNA sequence data. Botany 86: 682–696.
Iltis, H. H. & Cornejo, X. 2007. Studies in the Capparaceae XXX. Capparicordis, a new genus from the Neotropics. Brittonia 59: 246–254.
Kers, L. E. 2003. Capparaceae. In: Kubitzki, K. (Series Editor):The Families and Genera of Vascular Plants, Vol.5: K. Kubitzki & C. Bayer (Volume Editors).Springer-Verlag Berlin, 36-56. 
 Takhtajan, A. 1997. Diversity and classification of flowering plants.

External links

 Capparaceae, in Neotropikey 
 Capparaceae, in Flowering Plants of the Osa Peninsula, Costa Rica. 
 Photos at University of Hawaii site
 Capparaceae, as Capparidaceae in L. Watson and M.J. Dallwitz (1992 onwards). 
 Family Capparaceae flowers in Israel 

 
Brassicales families